Cătălin Petre Doman (born 30 January 1988 in Drobeta-Turnu Severin) is a Romanian professional footballer who plays as a midfielder for CSM Slatina.

Club career 
He played in Argeș Pitești youth team. In 2006, he was promoted to the first team, where he played only 3 games, then he moved to Romanian team Dacia Mioveni where he played 14 games and scored 1 goal. In 2007, he moved back to FC Argeș Pitești where he played 67 games and scored 6 goals.

Honours
FC Argeș Pitești
Liga II: 2007–08
Khazar Lankaran
Azerbaijan Cup: 2010–11
ACS Poli Timișoara
Liga II: 2014–15
Dunărea Călărași
Liga II: 2017–18
CSM Slatina
Liga III: 2019–20, 2021–22

References

External links
 
 

1988 births
Living people
Romanian footballers
Association football midfielders
Liga I players
Liga II players
FC Argeș Pitești players
CS Mioveni players
FC Rapid București players
ACS Poli Timișoara players
FC Dunărea Călărași players
CSM Slatina footballers
Azerbaijan Premier League players
Khazar Lankaran FK players
Romanian expatriate footballers
Expatriate footballers in Azerbaijan
Romanian expatriate sportspeople in Azerbaijan
People from Drobeta-Turnu Severin